Chauncey Walker West (February 6, 1827 – January 9, 1870) was a Mormon pioneer and was a leader of the Church of Jesus Christ of Latter-day Saints (LDS Church) in Utah Territory. He was among the church's first missionaries to preach in Sri Lanka.

West was born in Venango (possibly in the town of Pleasantville), Crawford County, Pennsylvania. He and his family joined the LDS Church when he was 16. In 1844, he moved with his parents to Nauvoo, Illinois to join the gathering of Latter Day Saints. In 1846, West's company of Mormon pioneers]left Nauvoo for Winter Quarters, Nebraska. There were three parts of the migration from Nauvoo to Winter Quarters that year. The first was the "winter exodus" from March to June. The second was the "spring exodus", and the finally the "fall exodus". West and his family were almost certainly part of the winter or spring exodus groups. The following year, in June 1847, he joined the Hunter/Horne Company on their journey to the Salt Lake Valley, arriving on September 29, 1847. Prior to his final journey to the Salt Lake Valley, both of West's parents died during the winter of 1846–1847 at Winter Quarters (Florence), Nebraska. West, now married and the father of one, traveled westward with his wife, Mary, his infant child, Margaret, and younger sister, Adelia Marie. His older brother, Ira, followed them a year later to Utah Territory.

In 1852, West was sent on an LDS Church mission to Asia. West preached in India, Ceylon, and Hong Kong. With his companion, Benjamin F. Dewey, West was the first LDS missionary to preach in Sri Lanka (Ceylon).

When he returned to Utah Territory in 1855, West was appointed the presiding bishop of Weber County, Utah Territory and moved to Ogden. West was involved in co-ordinating the employment of Latter-day Saints in the construction of the First transcontinental railroad for Central Pacific in Utah Territory, and on May 10, 1869 he was present as a representative of the LDS Church at the driving of the "Last Spike" at Promontory Summit, Utah.

West practiced plural marriage and had nine wives and 35 children.

West died during a business trip to San Francisco, California, and is buried in Ogden, Utah.

The city of Farr West, Utah, was named to honor West's contributions to Weber County, Utah.

See also
Elam Luddington

References

Sources
Franklin L. West (1965). Chauncey W. West: Pioneer—Churchman. (Salt Lake City, Utah)

1827 births
1870 deaths
People from Crawford County, Pennsylvania
American leaders of the Church of Jesus Christ of Latter-day Saints
19th-century Mormon missionaries
Converts to Mormonism
American Mormon missionaries in Hong Kong
American Mormon missionaries in India
Mormon missionaries in Sri Lanka
Mormon pioneers
People from Ogden, Utah
People from Weber County, Utah
American expatriates in Sri Lanka
Latter Day Saints from Pennsylvania
Latter Day Saints from Illinois
Latter Day Saints from Utah